Juan Domingo Córdoba (born 6 August 1972 in Santiago del Estero, Argentina)  is a former professional boxer who was a world champion at the light flyweight (108 lb) division.

Pro career 
Córdoba turned pro in 1992 and went 19-1-1 in his first 21 fights, winning in the process the Argentinean, South American and WBC International light-flyweight titles.  He challenged Humberto González for the WBC and IBF light-flyweight world titles in 1994, losing by a technical knockout in the 7th round. A second world title attempt in 1997 was also unsuccessful when he lost to Thai Chatchai Sasakul in 1997 for the interim WBC flyweight title. A year later he went down again to light-flyweight and had a successful world title fight for the WBO title against Melchor Cob Castro in his native Santiago del Estero. He would defend the title once in his hometown before losing it to Mexican Jorge Arce in Tijuana in 1998. He retired from boxing after the fight though he would come back again in late 2000. In 2001 he challenged Fernando Montiel for the world WBO flyweight title but suffered a first round KO in Acapulco, which resulted in his final professional bout.

Professional Record

See also 
List of light-flyweight boxing champions

External links 
 

1972 births
Living people
Light-flyweight boxers
World light-flyweight boxing champions
World Boxing Organization champions
Argentine male boxers